Simalia nauta, commonly known as the Tanimbar python, is a species of snake of the family Pythonidae.

Geographic range
The species is found in Indonesia.

References 

Reptiles described in 2000
Reptiles of Indonesia
Pythonidae